Seccombe or Secombe is a surname. Notable people with the surname include:
 Roger Seccombe (1940-2018), Australian filmmaker
 Alf Seccombe (born 1982), American filmmaker
 Andy Secombe (born 1953), Welsh actor and author
 Don Seccombe (born 1942), Australian cricketer
 Fred Secombe (born 1918), Welsh priest
 Harry Secombe (1921–2001), Welsh comedian and singer
 James Seccombe (1893–1970), American politician
 Joan Seccombe, Baroness Seccombe (born 1930), British peer
 Pauline Seccombe, maiden name of Pauline Hanson (born 1954), Australian politician
 Philip Seccombe, British politician
 Thomas Seccombe (1866–1923), English writer
 Victor Secombe (1897–1962), Australian general
 Wade Seccombe (born 1971), Australian cricketer

See also
 17166 Secombe, a main-belt asteroid (named for Harry Secombe)